Lorimar-Telepictures Corporation was an entertainment company established in 1985 with the merger of Lorimar Productions, Inc. and Telepictures Corporation. Headquartered at the former Metro-Goldwyn-Mayer Studios (now Sony Pictures Studios) in Culver City, California, its assets included television production and syndication (which operated under the Lorimar-Telepictures name), feature films, home video, and broadcasting.

History 
The merger of Lorimar-Telepictures was announced on October 7, 1985, by Merv Adelson. On February 19, 1986, the merger was complete. Lee Rich, one of the other founders of Lorimar, sold his shares in 1986 and left the company.

In 1987, Lorimar-Telepictures decided to launch separate divisions with brand logos, which are Lorimar Television for network television production, Lorimar Syndication for broadcast and off-net syndication, and Lorimar International for television distribution, with Lorimar-Telepictures being the parent company of the groups. Both had used Lorimar as operating names starting on January 19, 1987. It is reported that Robert Rosenbaum was named vice president of production at the Lorimar Television unit. Also that year, it faced a $21.7 million loss from the studio.

On January 11, 1989, Warner Communications acquired Lorimar-Telepictures after shaking off the hostile takeover of the company.

List of films/programs produced/distributed by Lorimar-Telepictures 
Note: All series listed here are now owned and distributed by Warner Bros. Television Studios with a few exceptions.

 The $1,000,000 Chance of a Lifetime
 Aaron's Way (1988)
 ALF (1986–1989)
 ALF: The Animated Series (1987–1989)
 ALF Tales (1988–1989)
 Alvin and the Chipmunks (1983–1989; Syndication of first 65 episodes only)
 Animalympics
 Apple's Way
 Bad Men of Tombstone (1949)
 The Bat (1959)
 Behind the Screen
 Berrenger's
 The Best Times
 Big Shamus, Little Shamus
 Blood & Orchids
 The Blue Knight
 Boone
 The Boy Who Could Fly (1986)
 Bridges to Cross
 Cat People (1982) 
 Catchphrase
 Chiller (1985) 
 The Choirboys (1977)
 Club Med (1986)
 The Comic Strip 
 Coming Out of the Ice (1982) 
 Dallas (1986–1989)
 Dark Night of the Scarecrow (1981) 
 Dark Victory (1976)
 The Days and Nights of Molly Dodd
  A Death in California 
 Detective in the House
 Doc Elliot
 The Dollmaker (1984) 
 Eight Is Enough: A Family Reunion (1987)
 Eight Is Enough
 Elephant Stampede (1951)
 Falcon Crest (1986–1989)
 Flamingo Road
 Flatbush
 Freddy's Nightmares (1988–1989) (with New Line Television and Stone Television)
 Friendly Persuasion (1956) 
 Full House (1987–1989)
 Fun House (with Stone Television)
 Games People Play
  Ghost of a Chance 
 Gorillas in the Mist (1988)
 The Greatest American Hero (1981-1983) (distribution only)
 Gumby (1987–1989)
 Hard Choices (theatrical film)
 Here's Lucy
 The Hogan Family (1986–1989)
 Hothouse House on Haunted Hill (1959)
 Into the Homeland (1987) 
 It's a Living (1986-1989)
 Jack Frost
 Jack the Ripper (1988)
 Jake's Journey (1988–1989 pilots for CBS starring Graham Chapman)
 Just Our Luck
 Kaz
 Killer Shark (1950)
 Knots Landing (1986–1989)
 Last Summer (1969) 
 The Last Starfighter (1984) 
  Legendary Ladies of Rock & Roll 
 Light Blast (1985) 
 Love Affair (1932) 
 Love Connection (1986–1989)
 Made in Heaven
 Maggie Briggs
 Mama's Family
 "Master Harold"...and the Boys (1985)
 The Master of Ballantrae (1984) 
 Matewan (1987) 
 Max Headroom (not the original pilot by Chrysalis Visual Programming for Channel Four UK)
 Mayberry R.F.D.
 Mazes and Monsters (1982) 
 Midnight Caller (1988–1989)
 Mitchell (1975)
 The Morning After (1974)
 The Morning After (1986)
 My Favorite Martian
 Never Say Goodbye (1956) 
 The New Dick Van Dyke Show
 One Big Family (1986–1987)
 Operation C.I.A. (1965) 
 Our House
 The People's Court (Joseph Wapner era)
 Perfect Match
 Perfect Strangers (1986–1989)
 Real People
 The Redd Foxx Show (1986)
 Reunion at Fairborough (1985)
 Rituals
 Rowan & Martin's Laugh-In
 The Sea Wolves (1980) 
 Second Serve
 Shattered Innocence (1988)
 She's the Sheriff (1987–1989)
 Sherlock Holmes Faces Death (1943) 
 Sherlock Holmes in Washington (1943) 
 SilverHawks
 Skag
 Snowfire (1958)
 Sorcerer (1977) 
 Spies (1987)
 The Stranger Within (1974)
  Summer Girl 
 Superior Court
 Tank (1984) 
 ThunderCats (1986–1989)
 Tickle Me (1965) 
 Tormented (1960)
 Triumphs of a Man Called Horse (1983) 
 Two Marriages
 The Waltons
 Warm Hearts, Cold Feet (1987)
 The Waverly Wonders
 Young Dillinger (1965)

Lorimar-Telepictures also distributed most of the pre-1990 DIC Entertainment and Saban Entertainment series in international markets; most of the DIC series are currently distributed by WildBrain, and most of the Saban series are currently distributed by Disney–ABC Domestic Television.

 Notes 

 Broadcasting 
Beginning in 1985, Telepictures had owned and operated multiple television stations – mostly in smaller markets, and when Lorimar and Telepictures merged in 1986, those stations carried over with the merger. Also, the merged company attempted to buy two more stations – then-third-party CBS network affiliate WTVJ in Miami-Fort Lauderdale, Florida (then-owned by Wometco Enterprises) and then-independent station WTTV in Indianapolis, Indiana and its satellite WTTK in Kokomo, Indiana, then-locally owned by Tel-Am Corporation. However, both attempts failed miserably, with CBS threatening to pull its affiliation from WTVJ – which would have forcibly turned the station into an independent, and as for WTTV and WTTK, those station were eventually sold to Capitol Broadcasting Company, based out of Raleigh, North Carolina. Today, WTVJ operates as an NBC network owned-and-operated station and WTTV and WTTK operate as CBS network affiliates owned and operated by Nexstar Media Group, ironically uniting them with former LTP station KMID.

Also in 1985, the company attempted to buy Multimedia, which at the time, owned and operated eight television stations and fifteen radio stations. In 1986, private equity firm Kohlberg Kravis Roberts attempted to sell to Lorimar-Telepictures six of the seven television stations it acquired from Storer Broadcasting, but like its attempts in acquiring WTVJ, WTTV and WTTK, both deals fell through with the Storer stations ultimately being sold to George N. Gillett Jr. in 1987. As for Multimedia, it was bought out by and absorbed into the Gannett in 1995, and its entire television division was eventually spun off into another company, Tegna Inc. in 2015.

 Notes 
 1 Stations owned by Telepictures prior its merger with its Lorimar Television in (month) of 1986.
 2 The sale of its spectrum during the FCC's 2016 United States wireless spectrum auction in 2016 as KGHZ, resulted in its assets, intellectual properties and corresponding ABC affiliation being moved to low-power station KYCW-LD, which immediately inherited the former's call letters, now as KSPR-LD. In the end, as a result of all of this, KGHZ, the original KSPR, was taken off the air permanently.
 3 KNVN is owned by Maxair Media, LLC and operated by Entertainment Studios through subsidiary Allen Media Broadcasting, under a Local marketing agreement.
 4 To reach all of Puerto Rico, almost immediately upon their acquisitions, WLII-DT and WSUR-TV reached an affiliation agreement with locally owned, then-newly launched WNJX-TV in Mayagüez, Puerto Rico, which lasted until 1994. Today, WLII and WSUR are Univision network affiliates now owned by Liberman Media Group alongside WOLE-DT in Aguadilla, Puerto Rico, serving Mayagüez. Meanwhile, WNJX now operates as full-time satellite station of another independent station, WAPA-TV', owned by Hemisphere Media Group.

References

External links

Telepictures
1986 establishments in California
1989 disestablishments in California
American companies established in 1986
American companies disestablished in 1989
Companies based in Culver City, California
Television production companies of the United States
Broadcasting companies of the United States
Mass media companies of the United States
Mass media companies established in 1986
Mass media companies disestablished in 1989
Joint ventures
Television syndication distributors